Pakuranga is a New Zealand Parliamentary electorate. It gave the Social Credit Party one of its few MPs when Neil Morrison held the seat from 1984 to 1987, but otherwise the electorate seat has been held by the National Party since 1972. 
Its current MP is Simeon Brown who has held the electorate since the 2017 general election.

Population centres
Pakuranga is one of 64 general electorates used in New Zealand general elections. It covers part of eastern Auckland around the eponymous suburb of Pakuranga. Other population centres include Farm Cove, Half Moon Bay, Bucklands Beach, parts of Highland Park and parts of Howick.

The boundaries of the Pakuranga electorate were last adjusted in the 2007 redistribution. No boundary adjustments were undertaken in the subsequent 2013/14 redistribution.

History

With the introduction of mixed-member proportional (MMP) representation in 1996 the seat was expanded to absorb most of the neighbouring seat of Howick. Its boundaries have remained largely unchanged since; an attempt in 2007 to resurrect a seat around Howick by pulling the Pakuranga boundaries across the Tamaki River and adding Panmure, Point England and Glen Innes from Auckland City was abandoned in the face of strenuous local objection. Instead, Howick was renamed Botany and centred on the rapid-growth areas of Flat Bush, Botany Downs and Dannemora.

Williamson announced in July 2016 that he would not stand for Parliament at the 2017 general election and the seat was won by Simeon Brown, retaining it for the National Party.

Members of Parliament
Unless otherwise stated, all MPs terms began and ended at a general election.

Key

List MPs
Members of Parliament elected from party lists in elections where that person also unsuccessfully contested the Pakuranga electorate. Unless otherwise stated, all MPs terms began and ended at general elections.

Election results

2020 election

2017 election

2014 election

2011 election

Electorate (as at 26 November 2011): 45,912

2008 election

2005 election

2002 election

1999 election
Refer to Candidates in the New Zealand general election 1999 by electorate#Pakuranga for a list of candidates.

1993 election

1990 election

1987 election

1984 election

1981 election

1978 election

1975 election

1972 election

1969 election

1966 election

1963 election

Table footnotes

Notes

References

External links
Electorate Profile  Parliamentary Library

New Zealand electorates in the Auckland Region
Politics of the Auckland Region
1963 establishments in New Zealand